Morina is a genus of the angiosperm family Caprifoliaceae. It is unofficially the provincial flower of the Khyber Pakhtunkhwa province of Pakistan. Morina is named in honor of Louis Morin de Saint-Victor (1635–1715), a French physician, botanist and meteorologist.

Species
 Morina coulteriana
 Morina longifolia
 Morina persica

References

Caprifoliaceae
Caprifoliaceae genera
Flora of Pakistan